Sander Hansen Sjøkvist (born 9 March 1999) is a Norwegian football midfielder who plays for Start.

Following a youth career in Start, he made his senior debut in March 2019 and his first-tier debut in June 2020 against Molde.

References

1999 births
Living people
Sportspeople from Kristiansand
Norwegian footballers
IK Start players
Norwegian First Division players
Eliteserien players
Association football midfielders
21st-century Norwegian people